Anaji is a town in the Western region of Ghana. It is 10 kilometres from the centre Takoradi, the Western regional capital.

Boundaries
The town is bordered on the north by Namibia (a suburb of Takoradi), to the West by Kansaworodo, to the east by Nkroful and to the South by Effiakuma.

Transportation 
The transportation system in Anaji is feasible

References

Populated places in the Western Region (Ghana)